Eneoptera surinamensis is a species of cricket from the genus Eneoptera.   The species was originally described by Charles De Geer in 1773

Description 
Eneoptera surinamensis is a tropical forest cricket, which lives in open areas of rain forest Like its fellow members of the subfamily Eneopterinae, E. surinamensis  eat leaves, flowers and fruits of living plants.  They deposit their eggs in pith, bark, or soft wood of plant stems.

Ecology 
Because of the species feeding on leaves, flowers and fruits of living plants, they occasionally damage plants of value to humans.

References

Crickets
Taxa named by Charles De Geer